Joyce Elaine MacKenzie Hassing (October 13, 1925 – June 10, 2021) was an American actress who appeared in films and television from 1946 to 1961. She might be best remembered for being the eleventh actress to portray Jane. She played the role opposite Lex Barker's Tarzan in Tarzan and the She-Devil (1953).

Early life through World War II
MacKenzie was the daughter of Dr and Mrs Norman MacKenzie. She was active in sports in high school, winning an award for "her all-round sports ability."

During World War II, MacKenzie worked as a carpenter's helper in shipyards in San Francisco. Her opportunity for acting came when she was discovered on her job as cashier at the Pasadena Playhouse in the summer of 1948.

Film actor
MacKenzie starred in a film noir, Destination Murder (1950). She appeared with James Stewart in the western Broken Arrow (also 1950), as the wife of Robert Mitchum in the crime drama The Racket (1951) and as a publisher's daughter trying to wrest control of editor Humphrey Bogart's newspaper in Deadline - U.S.A. (1952). MacKenzie's character and Jane Russell's exchanged identities in a musical, The French Line (1954).

Later years
Her final appearance was in the role of Nancy Gilman in the Perry Mason television series episode, "The Case of the Duplicate Daughter" (1961). After her acting career ended, MacKenzie was an English teacher; one of her students was radio host Anthony Cumia of Opie and Anthony.

Personal life and death
On November 26, 1952, MacKenzie married Walter H. "Tim" Leimert Jr. in Hollywood, California; the couple had two sons but divorced in 1960. In 1961, Joyce married Robert L. (Keiki) Driver until their divorce in 1966. And finally, in 1972, she married Victor Benedict Hassing until his death on October 29, 1980 at the age of 64.

MacKenzie died on June 10, 2021 in Hollywood, California, at the age of 95.

Filmography

References

External links

1925 births
2021 deaths
Actresses from California
American film actresses
American television actresses
People from Redwood City, California
21st-century American women